Sinan Cem Tanık (born 19 June 1980) is a Turkish professional volleyball coach and former player. He studied at the Middle East Technical University in Ankara.

Career
He played for the Polish team of Mlekpol AZS Olsztyn in the 2006–07 and 2007–08 season, and was the first Turkish player to have ever played in the Polish Volleyball League. He represented Turkey in over 100 games, and was a captain of the national team at the 2011 European Championship.

Honours

Clubs
 National championships
 2001/2002  Turkish Championship, with Erdemirspor Ereğli
 2011/2012  Greek Cup, with Iraklis Thessaloniki
 2011/2012  Greek Championship, with Iraklis Thessaloniki
 2011/2012  UAE Championship, with Al Ain
 2012/2013  Spanish Championship, with Unicaja Costa de Almería

Universiade
 2005  Summer Universiade

References

External links
 
 Player profile at PlusLiga.pl 
 Coach/Player profile at Volleybox.net

1980 births
Living people
Sportspeople from Ankara
Middle East Technical University alumni
Turkish men's volleyball players
Turkish expatriate sportspeople in Poland
Expatriate volleyball players in Poland
Turkish expatriate sportspeople in Greece
Expatriate volleyball players in Greece
Turkish expatriate sportspeople in the United Arab Emirates
Expatriate volleyball players in the United Arab Emirates
Turkish expatriate sportspeople in Spain
Expatriate volleyball players in Spain
Polis Akademisi volleyballers
Halkbank volleyball players
AZS Olsztyn players
Galatasaray S.K. (men's volleyball) players
Iraklis V.C. players
AZS Częstochowa coaches
Outside hitters